Tidestromia is a genus with about six or seven species of annual or subshrub perennial plants native to desert and semi-arid regions of the western United States, Mexico and tropical America in the family Amaranthaceae. A common name of some species is honeysweet.  The stems are reddish and contrast conspicuously with the silvery leaves. This genus is named for the botanist Ivar Tidestrom.

Species include:
 Tidestromia carnosa - fleshy honeysweet
 Tidestromia gemmata - TransPecos honeysweet
 Tidestromia lanuginosa - woolly tidestromia
 Tidestromia oblongifolia - Arizona honeysweet
 Tidestromia suffruticosa - shrubby honeysweet

Notes

References
  

Amaranthaceae
Amaranthaceae genera